Xanxerê is a city in Santa Catarina, southern Brazil. Italian and German are the mainstream cultures, having been brought by immigrants in the early 20th century through the migration of the "gauchos".

The city is one of the main production centers of corn in Brazil and serves as an important industrial, commercial and service center for western Santa Catarina. It is located in a key position for trades via Mercosul.

Xanxerê is the headquarters of the Association of Cities of Alto Irani (AMAI), composed of 17 "municípios".

On April 20, 2015, a destructive tornado hit the city. Many homes and businesses were severely damaged or destroyed, two people died, and another 120 were injured. The tornado was rated F3 on the Fujita Scale, according meteorologists. At least 2,600 homes were damaged or destroyed.

<noinclude>

References
 

Municipalities in Santa Catarina (state)